The Forder Lectureship is awarded by the London Mathematical Society to a research mathematician from the United Kingdom who has made an eminent contribution to the field of mathematics and who can also speak effectively at a more popular level. The lectureship is named for Professor H.G. Forder, formerly of the University of Auckland, and a benefactor of the London Mathematical Society. The lectureship was established in 1986 by the London Mathematical Society and the New Zealand Mathematical Society, and is normally awarded every two years. Recipients of the lectureship will give a four- to six-week lecturing tour of most New Zealand universities.

Recipients 
The recipients of the Forder Lectureship are:

 1987: E.C. Zeeman
 1989: Michael F. Atiyah
 1991: Peter Whittle
 1993: Roger Penrose
 1995: E.G. Rees
 1997: Ian Stewart
 1999: Michael Berry
 2001: Tom Körner
 2003: Caroline Series
 2005: Martin Bridson
 2008: Peter Cameron
 2010: Ben Green
 2012: Geoffrey Grimmett
 2015: Endre Süli
 2016: Julia Gog

See also

 List of mathematics awards

References 

Awards of the London Mathematical Society